Arthur W. Brown is an American diplomat who is the nominee to be the next United States Ambassador to Ecuador.

Early life and education
Brown has an M.B.A. degree from Johns Hopkins University, a B.A. degree from the University of Virginia, and an M.S. degree in National Security Strategy from the National War College.

Career
Brown is a career member of the Senior Foreign Service with the rank of Minister-Counselor. He has served as Deputy Chief of Mission at the U.S. Embassy in Harare, Zimbabwe since 2021. He was the USAID Mission Director at the embassy in Harare from 2020 to 2021. Before that, Brown served as the USAID Director in the Dominican Republic for four years, with almost half the tenure working with the Department of State as Deputy Chief of Mission at the U.S. Embassy in Santo Domingo. Brown has also served as USAID Director at the U.S. Embassy in Managua, Nicaragua. Additionally, Brown served in Kabul, Afghanistan and in Kinshasa, Democratic Republic of the Congo as USAID's Deputy Director. Other assignments for Brown include serving in various roles in Botswana, Guinea, Nigeria, Sierra Leone, Haiti, Jamaica, Barbados, and Namibia.

Before his tenure with USAID, Brown worked for Johns Hopkins University’s JHPIEGO Corporation, a nonprofit organization for international health, on international maternal and child health programs. Brown also served as a Rural Community Development Extension Agent in Benin, where he was a Peace Corps Volunteer.

Nomination as ambassador to Ecuador
On August 19, 2022, President Joe Biden nominated Brown to be the next ambassador to Ecuador. His nomination was sent to the Senate on September 6, 2022. The nomination was not acted upon for the rest of the year and was returned to President Biden on January 3, 2023.

President Biden renominated Brown the same day. His nomination is currently pending before the Senate Foreign Relations Committee.

Awards and recognitions
Brown is a recipient of the Franklin H. Williams award for Outstanding Community Leaders. Brown has also won numerous USAID performance awards along with the USAID Administrator’s Management Improvement Award.

Personal life
Brown is a resident of Pennsylvania. He speaks French and Spanish.

References

Living people
Johns Hopkins University alumni
University of Virginia alumni
National War College alumni
American diplomats
United States Foreign Service personnel
Peace Corps volunteers
Year of birth missing (living people)
People from Pennsylvania